Charles Christopher Brainerd Walker (June 27, 1824 – January 26, 1888) was a U.S. Representative from New York.

Born in Drewsville, New Hampshire, near Bellows Falls, Vermont, Walker completed preparatory studies. He moved to Corning, New York, in 1848. He was Postmaster of Corning 1856–1860, as well as a contractor engaging in the hardware and lumber business. During the Civil War, he served as brigade quartermaster with the rank of captain in the New York State Militia. He served as delegate to the Democratic National Conventions at Charleston in 1860 and at Baltimore in 1872.

Walker was elected as a Democrat to the Forty-fourth Congress, March 4, 1875, to March 3, 1877.

Subsequently, he resumed his former business activities. He served as member of the board of control of the New York Agricultural Experiment Station from June 10, 1885, until his death.  In addition, he was Chairman of the New York State Democratic Committee from 1887 until his death.

Walker died in Corning, New York on January 26, 1888. He was interred in Palmyra Cemetery, Palmyra, New York.

State Senator Charles E. Walker (1860–1893) was his son.

Sources

External links
Charles C. B. Walker at Political Graveyard

1824 births
1888 deaths
People from Walpole, New Hampshire
Quartermasters
American militia officers
Democratic Party members of the United States House of Representatives from New York (state)
Politicians from Corning, New York
New York (state) postmasters
19th-century American politicians